Zigana may refer to :

 Zigana Pass, a mountain pass in the Pontic Mountains og northeastern Anatolia, Turkey
 Zigana Tunnel, through the pass
 2009 Zigana avalanche
 Curiate Italian for Zygana, a former bishopric and present Latin Catholic titular see at Cobuleti in Lazica, now in Georgia
 Zigana (pistol), an automatic pistol produced by Turkish firearm manufacturing company TİSAŞ

See also 
 Zygaena, a genus of moths typical for the family Zygaenidae
 Pronous, a genus of spiders with the synonym "Zigana"